The Supreme Court of the Soviet Union was the highest court of the Soviet Union during its existence. The Supreme Court of the USSR included a Military Collegium and other elements which were not typical of supreme courts found in other countries, then or now. The first chairman of the Supreme Court was Nikolai Krylenko.

See also
Military Collegium of the Supreme Court of the USSR
Ministry of Justice of the USSR
People's Court of the USSR
Procurator General of the USSR

References

Soviet Union
Government of the Soviet Union
Law enforcement in the Soviet Union
1923 establishments in the Soviet Union
1992 disestablishments
Defunct courts
Courts and tribunals established in 1923
Courts and tribunals disestablished in 1992